Cutler Park is a large municipal park at the eastern end of Visalia, California near Venice Hills. It is one of the largest Valley Oak Woodlands in Central California.

History
In 1919, John Cutler Jr. donated a heavily wooded  parcel to the County of Tulare for a park.  Located adjacent to the St. Johns River on Houston Avenue, the park was named in honor of the donor's father, John cutler, an 1852 pioneer of Tulare County.  The senior Cutler was a big farmer and one of Tulare County's first judges.

References

Parks in Tulare County, California
Geography of Visalia, California
Municipal parks in California